Jasmin Raboshta (born 30 April 1990 in Shkodër) is an Albanian professional footballer who plays for Burreli.

Career statistics

Luftëtari
Following the end of 2011–12, Raboshta extended his contract with Luftëtari for a further season, kepping him at the club until 2013.

Butrinti
In August 2014, Raboshta joined on a free transfer Butrinti by signing a one-year deal, taking the vacant number 9 for the upcoming 2013–14 season. The team coach Mustafa Hysi stated, "We have wanted him so bad and the president didn't hesitate to fulfil our wish."

Kastrioti
On 27 June 2015, Raboshta was signed by fellow Kategoria e Parë side Kastrioti for an undisclosed fee in their bid to achieve promotion back to Kategoria Superiore.

Teuta
On 13 July 2016, after a successful individual season with Kastrioti, Raboshta returned in Kategoria Superiore and joined Teuta on a free transfer, where he penned a one-year contract. Upon signing, Raboshta stated: "I'm part of an important club in Albania and I want to thank the club directors and the coach for believing in me, by making me part of Teuta. For me, it's a pleasure to be part of this team".

Career statistics

References

External links

1990 births
Living people
Footballers from Shkodër
Albanian footballers
Association football forwards
KF Vllaznia Shkodër players
KS Ada Velipojë players
KF Elbasani players
KS Pogradeci players
Luftëtari Gjirokastër players
KF Butrinti players
KS Kastrioti players
KF Teuta Durrës players
KF Bylis Ballsh players
KF Vushtrria players
KF Llapi players
KS Burreli players
Kategoria Superiore players
Kategoria e Parë players
Football Superleague of Kosovo players
Albanian expatriate footballers
Expatriate footballers in Turkey
Albanian expatriate sportspeople in Turkey
Expatriate footballers in Kosovo
Albanian expatriate sportspeople in Kosovo